Umu may refer to:
 A variety of earth ovens in Polynesia, including:
 Māori umu tī, used to cook Cordyline australis and other varieties of Cordyline with similar large tap roots.
 Māori hāngi, also called umu in Samoa, especially in older texts
 (u)mu, the Class I singular noun class in the Kinyarwanda language
 Umu Oma, a village in southeastern Nigeria
 Willaq Umu, High Priests of the Sun in the Inca Empire

See also 
 UMU (disambiguation)
 Yumu (disambiguation)